Football is the most popular sport played in the Democratic Republic of the Congo. The national football team has won the African Cup of Nations twice: in 1968 and 1974 under the nations' former name Zaire. The national team qualified for the World Cup in 1974, their only appearance in that tournament.

Domestic football

At club level, in the 2010 FIFA Club World Cup, TP Mazembe made history as the first ever African club to reach a FIFA tournament final, beating the 2010 Copa Libertadores champions SC Internacional in the semifinals and losing to European Champions Internazionale in the final.

International football
Although DR Congo has had limited international success since the late 1970s, numerous players of Congolese descent have played professionally in Europe, including Romelu Lukaku, Aaron Wan-Bissaka, Jonathan Ikoné, Michy Batshuayi, Youri Tielemans, Steve Mandanda, Tanguy Ndombele, Christian Benteke, Elio Capradossi, Sara Gama, Axel Tuanzebe, Isaac Kiese Thelin, José Bosingwa and Denis Zakaria.

In international competitions, DR Congo has only qualified for three FIFA tournaments, the 1974 FIFA World Cup for the senior men's side, and the 2006 and 2008 FIFA U-20 Women's World Cups, achieved by the U-20 women's side.

+50,000-capacity football stadiums

See also   
 DR Congo national football team   
 DR Congo women's national football team   
 Congolese Association Football Federation

References

Further reading